The following is a list of characters that first appeared in the BBC soap opera EastEnders in 2000, by order of first appearance. All characters were introduced by Matthew Robinson, or his successor, John Yorke. The first character to be introduced was Sandra di Marco (Clare Wilkie), the estranged wife of Beppe di Marco (Michael Greco). Laura Beale (Hannah Waterman), a love interest for Ian Beale (Adam Woodyatt), and Sophie Braddock (Hayley Angel Wardle), a new teenage character, were introduced in February, whereas  Rod Morris (Forbes Masson), the tutor of Nicky di Marco (Carly Hillman) and Maureen Carter (Diana Coupland), the aunt of Irene Raymond (Roberta Taylor) were introduced for guest stints in March and May, respectively. Fiona Morris (Ashley Jensen), Rod's wife, appeared in June. Barbara Owen (Sheila Hancock), Steve Owen (Martin Kemp) and Jackie Owen's (Race Davies) mother made her first appearance in July, and Jack Robbins (Chook Sibtain), Sandra's former lover, debuted in August.

The Slater family — Charlie Slater (Derek Martin), Mo Harris (Laila Morse), Lynne Slater (Elaine Lordan), Garry Hobbs (Ricky Groves), Kat Slater (Jessie Wallace), Little Mo Morgan (Kacey Ainsworth) and Zoe Slater (Michelle Ryan) — as well as Danny Harrison (Eddie Osei), a building contractor, Eddie Skinner (Richard Vanstone), the nephew of Ethel Skinner (Gretchen Franklin), and Kevin (Daniel Mays), Kat's former boyfriend, were introduced in September. Kerry Skinner, the daughter of Eddie, Bex Fowler, the newborn daughter of Sonia Jackson (Natalie Cassidy) and Martin Fowler (James Alexandrou), Ameena Badawi (Shobna Gulati), a social worker, made their first appearance in October. Audrey Trueman (Corinne Skinner-Carter) and Anthony Trueman (Nicholas Bailey) were introduced in November and December respectively as the start of a new black family, the Truemans, while Trevor Morgan (Alex Ferns), the abusive husband of Little Mo, made his first appearance in late December.

Sandra di Marco

Sandra di Marco, played by Clare Wilkie, is the estranged wife of Beppe di Marco (Michael Greco), and mother of his son Joe (Jake Kyprianou). She had walked out on the family when Joe was just one year old.

Sandra reappears in Beppe and Joe's lives in 2000 when she tracks them down to Walford. She had left them because Beppe's family, and in particular his grandparents Bruno and Luisa (Leon Lissek and Stella Tanner), resented her for not being Italian. Sandra wanted to go back to work after having Joe, but the family would not allow it, and when Beppe started siding with his family on the issue, Sandra decided to leave him and her son. She later moved in with Beppe's police partner, Jack Robbins (Chook Sibtain). She left Jack to track down her son, and although she is met with hostility at first, she and Beppe soon grow closer and eventually rekindle their romance, much to the disgust of Beppe's family.

Beppe is still in love with Sandra and soon begins pressurising her to have more children. The suggestion is met with hostility and she flatly refuses. Soon after, Jack arrives in Albert Square looking for Sandra. It turns out that Sandra had left Jack, following a miscarriage that left her unable to have children. Sandra tries to deny her feelings for Jack, but eventually she admits that she is still in love with him and has only reconciled with Beppe so she can get custody of her son. She and Jack reignite their romance, and Sandra makes plans to flee Walford with Jack and Joe. However, Beppe catches them just as they are about to leave and when he realises what is going on, he attacks Jack, takes Joe back and denies Sandra any access. Sandra and Jack subsequently threaten to take Beppe to court for custody of Joe. Beppe retaliates by using his police contacts to plant drugs on Jack, getting him sacked from the force. The constant rowing is having a negative effect on Joe and he finds it difficult to choose between his warring parents. This culminates in him getting hit by a car when he disobeys his father and runs across the road to be with his mother. Joe is not seriously hurt, but the accident makes his parents rethink their behaviour. Beppe eventually allows Sandra visitation rights, and so she leaves Walford with Jack.

Laura Beale

Laura Beale, played by Hannah Waterman, is employed by local businessman Ian Beale (Adam Woodyatt) as a nanny for his children, Peter (Joseph Shade), Lucy (Casey Anne Rothery) and Steven Beale (Edward Savage). The two eventually become a couple, but when Laura announces that she wants a baby, Ian has a secret vasectomy. When Laura becomes pregnant, Ian throws her out, believing that the baby cannot be his. However, it is later revealed that Ian is the father of Laura's child after all. Laura was killed off on 30 April 2004 after falling down the stairs and breaking her neck, with her arch-enemy Janine Butcher (Charlie Brooks) being accused of murdering her.

Sophie Braddock

Sophie Braddock, played by Hayley Angel Wardle, attends Walford High School with Sonia Jackson (Natalie Cassidy), Nicky di Marco (Carly Hillman) and Jamie Mitchell (Jack Ryder). Sonia is jealous of her and nicknames her "Braddock the Haddock". Jamie asks her out on a date, much to the annoyance of Sonia. The date goes well, and Jamie is shocked when Sophie has sex with him in his godfather Phil (Steve McFadden)'s bed.

Rod Morris

Rodney "Rod" Morris, played by Forbes Masson, is the tutor of Nicky di Marco (Carly Hillman) who had been contacted by her mother Rosa (Louise Jameson) to help Nicky study for her exams. Nicky becomes attracted to Rod and goes out of her way to make him notice her by doing her hair differently and wearing different outfits. On one of Rod's visits, he buys Nicky a copy of Five's album Invincible (which she had been saving up for) as a reward for her hard work. As time passes, Nicky's feelings for Rod begin to run deeper. Rod tells Nicky she has caught up enough and they can end the lessons. Nicky desperately tries to convince Rosa to have a word with Rod to get him to change his mind. Rod and his wife Fiona (Ashley Jensen) come to the di Marcos for dinner and it is obvious to Fiona that Nicky has a crush on her husband.

Nicky finally makes a move on her tutor and he initially reciprocates, but then takes things too far and sexually assaults her. Nicky is found in tears by Rosa and her brother, Gianni (Marc Bannerman) stating that Rod had attacked her. Rod is then arrested, questioned and later bailed. Rod is attacked by a drunken Gianni who has come to avenge his sister. Gianni is then subsequently arrested and charged with GBH and drink-driving. Nicky later admits she was the one that kissed Rod and he reciprocated. The end result is Rod admitting to not being able to control himself, and escaping a 15-year prison sentence.

Maureen Carter

Maureen Carter, played by Diana Coupland, is Irene Raymond (Roberta Taylor)'s aunt. Maureen arrives in Walford visiting Irene and her husband Terry (Gavin Richards). She is unpopular with Terry, and outstays her welcome. Whilst she is living in Albert Square, she tries to seduce Jim Branning (John Bardon), much to his annoyance. One night during a party at The Queen Victoria public house, Maureen wants to treat Jim for a night of fun, and starts to approach him. When Jim sees her, he quickly grabs Dot Cotton (June Brown) and kisses her. Dot slaps Jim, but after Maureen sees them kissing, she quickly leaves Walford.

Fiona Morris

Fiona Morris, played by Ashley Jensen, appears in five episodes, first broadcast in June 2000. She is the wife of Rod Morris (Forbes Masson).

Fiona first appears when her and Rod come to the di Marco's for dinner. She notices that Rod's pupil, Nicky di Marco (Carly Hillman), has a crush on him. She is seen again when Nicky's brother, Gianni di Marco (Marc Bannerman), comes to the Morrises' home and attacks Rod, whom Nicky has accused of sexually assaulting her. Fiona tries to fend Gianni off but is shoved to the floor in the process.

Several days later, Fiona appears in Albert Square and corners Nicky in an attempt to get her to drop her case against Rod, but is interrupted when a journalist enters the scene to ask Nicky about the events, prompting her to flee. Later, Nicky, Gianni and their mother, Rosa di Marco (Louise Jameson), arrive to confront Fiona after she labels Nicky a "tart"; the pair begin arguing and Fiona states that Nicky has been flirting with Rod for weeks and that Rod has been a teacher for the past 11 years and has never behaved inappropriately towards a student.

Barbara Owen

Barbara Owen, played by Sheila Hancock, is introduced as the mother of Steve Owen (Martin Kemp) and Jackie Owen (Race Davies). She first appears in July 2000 and appears again in March 2001, before making her final appearance in July 2001.

Barbara first appears when Steve, who is going through a drugs problem, visits her after discovering that she has terminal heart disease. Barbara is obsessed with the British royal family, though not so caring about her own children. Eight months later, Barbara attends Steve's wedding to Mel Healy (Tamzin Outhwaite), taking a shine to his nemesis Phil Mitchell (Steve McFadden), to the point of putting his photograph on her fireplace mantel.

Four months later, Steve visits Barbara when she is in a critical condition and confronts her about the abuse she'd showered on him when he was a child. She tries to defend her actions by saying her husband left her to bring up two children with no money. She refuses to let Steve call an ambulance and asks him to kiss her. He gives her a peck on the forehead but she asks for a kiss on the lips. When he leans forward, she grabs him and gives him an extremely passionate kiss, telling him he is an attractive man. Steve is disgusted and leaves. Barbara dies soon after. Mel is the only person in attendance at Barbara's funeral, while Steve is having sex with another woman.

When Steve dies in a car explosion eight months after Barbara's death, his ashes are dumped on Barbara's grave by Phil. Seventeen years after Barbara's death, Mel returns to Walford with her and Steve's son, Hunter Owen (Charlie Winter), who learns that Steve was a villain. Mel finds Hunter at Barbara's grave and she blames Barbara for the way Steve was, describing her as an "evil witch".

Jack Robbins

Jack Robbins, played by Chook Sibtain, is a former police colleague of Beppe di Marco (Michael Greco) and a former lover of Beppe's wife, Sandra (Clare Wilkie). Jack arrives in Albert Square to try to win Sandra back but she is insistent that she loves Beppe, having reconciled with him several months earlier. It turns out that Sandra had left Jack following a miscarriage that left her unable to have children.

Sandra tries to deny her feelings for Jack, but eventually she admits that she is still in love with him and has only reconciled with Beppe so she can get custody of her son, Joe (Jake Kyprianou). She and Jack reignite their romance and Sandra makes plans to flee Walford with Jack and Joe. However, Beppe catches them just as they are about to leave and when he realises what is going on he attacks Jack, takes Joe back and denies Sandra any access. Sandra and Jack subsequently threaten to take Beppe to court for custody of Joe. Beppe retaliates by using his police contacts to plant drugs on Jack, getting him sacked from the force. Jack later reveals that the charges did not stick. Beppe eventually allows Sandra visitation rights and so Jack and her leave Walford in March 2001.

Charlie Slater

Charlie Slater, played by Derek Martin, arrives in Walford with his mother-in-law Mo Harris (Laila Morse), daughters Lynne (Elaine Lordan), Kat (Jessie Wallace), Little Mo (Kacey Ainsworth), and Zoe (Michelle Ryan), plus Lynne's boyfriend, Garry Hobbs (Ricky Groves). "An easy-going family man", Charlie has also been described as the "rock that keeps the Slater family together". In 2010, the character was axed by new executive producer Bryan Kirkwood as part of a plan to "breathe new life into the show". Charlie made guest returns in 2011 and 2013, before making a final guest stint in January 2016, when the character was killed off after suffering a heart attack.

Danny Harrison

Danny Harrison, played by Eddie Osei, is a building contractor who works on 'Beale's Homes' in 2000, converting a school into flats for Ian Beale (Adam Woodyatt). He is upset when Ian goes behind his back and chooses to another building contractor. Ian refuses to pay Danny, so he spreads rumours of Ian's financial situation, which eventually reaches the new builders working on the development, causing a workers' strike. When Ian does not pay Danny, he is eventually declared bankrupt.

Mo Harris

Mo Harris, played by Laila Morse, moves to Albert Square with her son-in-law Charlie Slater (Derek Martin) and granddaughters Lynne (Elaine Lordan), Kat (Jessie Wallace), Little Mo (Kacey Ainsworth) and Zoe (Michelle Ryan). She has an instant rivalry with Pat Evans (Pam St. Clement), with whom she used to be friends many years ago. Indeed, Mo was at one time married to Pat's brother. Much of Mo's time is spent selling stolen goods, which are normally of poor quality, and she often trades with a man known as "Fat Elvis". Mo departs in January 2016 and returns in March 2018.

Lynne Hobbs

Lynne Hobbs, played by Elaine Lordan, is the eldest daughter of Charlie Slater (Derek Martin). She arrives in Albert Square with the rest of her family. Lynne is in a relationship with Garry Hobbs (Ricky Groves) and she spends much of her time despairing over Garry's inability to fully commit to their relationship. Eventually Garry agrees to marry Lynne, but on the eve of her wedding she has sex with Beppe di Marco (Michael Greco). The marriage goes ahead anyway, but it is not long before Lynne embarks on another affair. She departed on 2 July 2004.

Garry Hobbs

Garry Hobbs, played by Ricky Groves, comes to Walford with his girlfriend Lynne Slater (Elaine Lordan) and her family. He is initially reluctant to commit to Lynne, but the pair do eventually marry. The marriage is volatile however, and Lynne leaves Garry in 2004 which leads to Garry to attempting suicide. He manages to recover with the help of his friend, Minty Peterson (Cliff Parisi), and develops a romantic interest in Dawn Swann (Kara Tointon). Garry and Dawn left the show together on 27 August 2009.

Kat Slater

Kat Slater, played by Jessie Wallace, is the daughter of Charlie Slater (Derek Martin), and arrives with her sisters Lynne Hobbs (Elaine Lordan) and Little Mo Morgan (Kacey Ainsworth). Her daughter Zoe Slater (Michelle Ryan) is initially believed to be her sister as well until Kat reveals she was raped by her uncle Harry Slater (Michael Elphick) as a child. She later marries Alfie Moon (Shane Richie). She appears in the show from September 2000 to December 2005, and returns in September 2010. After departing in May 2015, Kat and Alfie returned again in December, before leaving in January 2016, commencing their own spin-off series, Redwater. In 2018, Wallace reprised her role as Kat.

Little Mo Mitchell

Little Mo Mitchell, played by Kacey Ainsworth, is the daughter of Charlie Slater (Derek Martin), and arrives with her sisters Lynne Hobbs (Elaine Lordan) and Kat Slater (Jessie Wallace). Little Mo is married to Trevor Morgan (Alex Ferns), and though she loves him, Trevor's severe mood swings and physical and emotional violence ruins their marriage. Trevor dies in a house fire, and Little Mo eventually marries Billy Mitchell (Perry Fenwick). However their marriage is ruined when Little Mo is raped by Graham Foster (Alex McSweeney). Little Mo appeared regularly until 26 May 2006.

Zoe Slater

Zoe Slater, played by Michelle Ryan, is the presumed youngest daughter of Charlie Slater (Derek Martin). It is later revealed that one of Charlie's other daughters, Kat (Jessie Wallace) was raped by her uncle Harry Slater (Michael Elphick), making Kat Zoe's mother, and Charlie her uncle and grandfather. Zoe becomes romantically involved with Dennis Rickman (Nigel Harman), but when Zoe lies that she is pregnant, to keep Dennis, a tragic turn of events lead to Zoe being implicated in the murder of Den Watts (Leslie Grantham), the father of Dennis. Zoe left the serial on 24 June 2005.

Eddie Skinner

Eddie Skinner, played by Richard Vanstone, arrives in Walford on 18 September 2000 on the day of his aunt Ethel Skinner (Gretchen Franklin)'s funeral and later begins lodging with the Fowlers at number 45, along with his daughter, Kerry (Gemma McCluskie). Eddie was born and bred in Walford, and knows many of the current residents, such as Pat Evans (Pam St. Clement), Mo Harris (Laila Morse), Pauline Fowler (Wendy Richard) and Dot Cotton (June Brown) from his youth. He also knew Den Watts (Leslie Grantham), Pete Beale (Peter Dean), Arthur Fowler (Bill Treacher), Angie Watts (Anita Dobson) and Kathy Beale (Gillian Taylforth) from his time at Walford. He had left Walford in 1970.

Eddie begins working on Mark Fowler (Todd Carty)'s stall and later develops a crush on Mark's mother Pauline, but it is not reciprocated. It is revealed that Nick Cotton (John Altman) had spent some time in prison with Eddie and blackmails Eddie for regular payments or he will reveal this to Pauline, but Eddie tells her first. Eddie later leaves the Square, his whereabouts are currently unknown.

Kevin

Kevin, played by Daniel Mays, is the ex-boyfriend of Kat Slater (Jessie Wallace). He appears unexpectedly on 19 September 2000 and finds Kat after Melanie Owen (Tamzin Outhwaite) tells him where Kat and her family live. Kat and Kevin have a row with the neighbours watching, but are interrupted when Kat's grandmother Mo Harris (Laila Morse) soaks him with water and Kat's father Charlie Slater (Derek Martin) takes him home in his cab. He returns on 25 September, when he calls in the middle of the night. Mo soaks him with water again. He returns to number 23 and asks Charlie where Kat is. He goes to The Queen Victoria pub and finds Kat and her family dancing. He tries to win Kat back but she rejects him. He returns again on 9 October, and Mo tells him Kat is not in the house. Kevin is convinced that Mo is lying and chains himself to the gate outside. Kevin escapes and Kat tells him to back off. He is not seen again.

Kerry Skinner

Kerry Skinner, played by Gemma McCluskie, arrives in Walford on 19 October 2000, as the daughter of Eddie Skinner (Richard Vanstone) and the great niece of the recently deceased Ethel Skinner (Gretchen Franklin). She is also friends of Zoe Slater (Michelle Ryan). Kerry briefly dates Robbie Jackson (Dean Gaffney) and gets him to propose to her. However, things do not work out, as it turns out that Kerry had got engaged to another man, Darren (Stephen Hoyle), while she was on holiday. She leaves the square in March 2001.

Bex Fowler

Rebecca "Bex" Fowler (also Chloe Jackson and Rebecca Miller) is the daughter of Martin Fowler (James Alexandrou/James Bye) and Sonia Jackson (Natalie Cassidy). She appears from her birth in 2000 until 2002, played by Alex and Vicky Gonzalez, and returns from 2005, played by Jade Sharif, before departing with her on-screen parents in 2007. Coinciding with Sonia and Martin's reintroductions, the character returned in a regular capacity from 2014, recast again to Jasmine Armfield, and became central among the series' teenage characters over the subsequent years. On 28 January 2020, it was announced that Armfield had decided to leave the soap; she departed on-screen in the episode broadcast on 6 March 2020.

Sonia does not know she is pregnant until she goes into labour and Mo Harris (Laila Morse) delivers the baby. After her daughter is born, Sonia is taken to hospital and tells her social worker Ameena Badawi (Shobna Gulati) upon meeting her that she does not want her baby. She names her baby Chloe and Sonia decides she wants Chloe adopted. Sonia hands Chloe over to Ameena, who takes Chloe into foster care. Martin and his mother, Pauline Fowler (Wendy Richard), discover Martin is the father, Pauline wants custody of Chloe, which Sonia is against. Martin agrees that he wants Chloe for Pauline's sake, but admits to his brother, Mark Fowler (Todd Carty), that he does not want to be a father and Chloe is adopted by Neil and Sue Miller (Sadie Shimmin). The Millers change Chloe's name to Rebecca. In 2002, Sonia, now suffering depression over the guilt of abandoning her daughter, kidnaps Rebecca and barricades herself inside her house. Neil and Sue (now Victoria Willing), understandably upset about Sonia's actions, give Dot Branning (June Brown) fifteen minutes to persuade Sonia to give Rebecca back before they phone the police. Dot successfully persuades Sonia to give Rebecca back.

In 2005, Neil and Sue are killed in a car crash and Rebecca moves in with Sue's mother, Margaret Wilson (Janet Amsden). Sonia reads about the crash in the newspaper and she and Martin, who are now married, are concerned for their daughter and decide to track her down to make sure she is well. Posing as friends of the Millers, Margaret allows the Fowlers into their home where they meet Rebecca (now Sharif). It is only when they admit who they really are that she tells them to leave. Pauline demands to be part of Rebecca's life, causing upset. Sonia is furious when she discovers Pauline and Martin have been seeing her daughter behind her back. Eventually Sonia gives into her urges and grows closer to Rebecca too. Margaret decides to make Sonia and Martin Rebecca's legal guardians in case anything happens to her, unaware that Sonia and Martin have separated due to Sonia's lesbian adultery. Sonia persuades Martin not to tell Margaret that they have split up, but when the truth comes out, Margaret is furious and refuses to give Sonia guardianship of Rebecca. When Margaret has a fall and dies, Rebecca is given to Martin and Pauline refuses Sonia access, causing many rows.

Sonia and Martin reunite in December 2006. On Christmas Day 2006, Pauline dies just before emigrating to America. Rebecca saw Sonia slap Pauline before her death and believes that Sonia killed Pauline. Sonia tries to hush Rebecca but the truth comes out and Sonia is arrested following a row with Martin. After absconding with Rebecca, Sonia is cleared of Pauline's murder when Joe Macer (Ray Brooks), Pauline's husband, admits to manslaughter. Sonia leaves Walford with Martin and Rebecca in February 2007.

Rebecca returned on 15 January 2014, now portrayed by Armfield, when Carol Jackson (Lindsey Coulson) tells Sonia about her breast cancer diagnosis. Rebecca is seen in October 2014 when Sonia discovers that she has been missing school to practice her guitar for music school with Charlie Cotton (Declan Bennett). Having arranged for Rebecca to appear at the Queen Vic, Charlie calls Sonia. Rebecca performs a cover song of "You and I" by One Direction. In March 2015, Rebecca, tired of strife between her parents, enters a rebellious phase of her life. She adopts a goth fashion style and insists on being referred to by her former name, Chloe, before deciding to go by Bex. Bex rejects Sonia as she has been living away from them, and they become further estranged when Martin (now Bye) reveals Sonia is having a lesbian relationship with Tina Carter (Luisa Bradshaw-White). Martin, realising the situation may be his own fault, decides to have Bex live with Sonia, reasoning that she needs to spend more time with her mother.

Martin starts a relationship with Stacey Branning (Lacey Turner) and moves in with her and her daughter Lily Branning (Aine Garvey). Martin plans to propose to Stacey and Bex gives him her blessing but is glad when they decide not to marry. Stacey gives birth to a son, Arthur Fowler, although unbeknownst to Martin, Arthur is not his son. When Stacey is diagnosed with and sectioned due to postpartum psychosis, Bex realises Martin is struggling with Arthur, Lily and work, so she draws him up a schedule. She accompanies Martin on a visit to the hospital to see Stacey. When Martin learns the truth about Arthur's paternity, he goes to stay with his sister Michelle Fowler (Susan Tully) in America and when he returns, he intends to leave for good. Martin then reveals that Kush Kazemi (Davood Ghadami) is Arthur's father to everyone in the pub, including Bex. Martin tells Bex that Arthur is still her brother, and Bex later explains to Stacey that she hurt her father. When Martin and Stacey get engaged, Martin tells Bex, who says that Arthur really is her brother now.

Bex takes Louise Mitchell (Tilly Keeper) to school on her first day and when Louise has a fight, Jay Brown (Jamie Borthwick) collects her and the girl she had a fight with turns out to be Jay's girlfriend, Linzi Bragg (Amy-Leigh Hickman). Bex and Louise tell Jay that Linzi is Bex's friend, Star, and is 14. Linzi gets upset when Jay is adamant things are over, and Bex comforts her. Bex tells Linzi's mother, Thelma Bragg (Lorraine Stanley) about the relationship, and points out Jay to her when she demands to know who has been having sex with Linzi. Although Jay has not had sex with Linzi, Bex states that Thelma's accusations are true. Jay is arrested and Bex is interviewed by police. After Bex tells Sonia that she has had sex, Sonia, Sharon Mitchell (Letitia Dean) and Honey Mitchell (Emma Barton), talk to her and Louise about the pressures and consequences of sex, but Bex reveals that she has not had sex. When Sonia finds a lump in her breast, she tells Bex, who fears that Sonia has cancer, but it turns out to be a cyst. Bex has a crush on newcomer Shakil Kazemi (Shaheen Jafargholi) and is jealous when Louise flirts with him. At Martin and Stacey's reception, Bex and Shakil kiss, seen by a jealous Louise. Martin struggles to accept Bex dating, and after disputes between Martin and Shakil, Sonia gets them to make amends for Bex's sake.

Tina's mother Sylvie Carter (Linda Marlowe), who suffers from Alzheimer's disease, later moves in with Sonia and Tina, but Bex does not cope looking after her when Sonia and Tina are not around. Bex is stunned when Shakil tells her he wants to have sex with her. Bex tells him that she is not ready for sex and she talks about it with Louise, who tells her Shakil will not wait for long. After taking advice from Louise, Bex decides to change her appearance. Bex confides in Stacey about Shakil wanting to have sex, who mentions this to Martin; Martin interrupts Shakil's party, but later apologises to Bex.

Sonia is offered a job in Kettering and Martin and Stacey agree for Bex to live with them. Bex is angry and upset with Sonia and refuses to say goodbye, but Tina arranges for them to talk. Bex is upset and Shakil comforts her. Bex moves in with Martin and Stacey, but struggles to cope with the overcrowding until they move into Sonia's old house. When Bex discovers Shakil has bought condoms, she cancels her 16th birthday party to avoid him. Stacey advises Bex to tell Shakil how she feels. When the pair are alone in Bex's room, she stops him from going further than kissing, so he calls her frigid. However, Shakil apologises to Bex and she forgives him. Bex finds out from Louise and Shakil that people are talking about her relationship and about her and Shakil not having sex. Shakil suggests to Bex they send explicit photos of themselves to each other instead of sex. After talking with Louise and Tina, Bex decides to take an explicit photo. She tells Louise she has not sent the photo and thinks Shakil is not interested in her when he ignores her. Bex confronts Shakil about his ignoring her and Bex admits to Shakil that she did not want to break the law and feared the photos being shared, but apologises for hurting his feelings. Bex then tells Shakil she wants to have sex with him and they try to arrange a place and time that they can be alone. Bex goes round to Shakil's whilst his mother Carmel Kazemi (Bonnie Langford) and brother Kush are out and they have sex. Immediately afterwards, Shakil sees Bex and Louise talking and assumes Bex is telling Louise about it, so he ignores Bex and refuses to tell her if they are still together. Bex asks Stacey how to know if you're having sex right and explains how Shakil is behaving towards her. Bex is upset when Shakil changes his online status to single. An upset Bex tells Stacey she has been dumped, who tells Martin and she is left embarrassed when Martin publicly has a go at Shakil. Martin's aunt and godmother, Kathy Beale (Gillian Taylforth) tries to justify his actions, but Bex refuses to forgive Martin or Stacey until she watches Shakil kiss Louise as part of the Christmas play. Bex shows Louise a prospectus for a college after deciding she needs a fresh start but decides to stay at her school's 6th form to study A-Levels.

Keegan Baker (Zack Morris) insults Bex and she finds out Shakil was one of the boys who teased Louise with Keegan and warns him to stay away from her. When the school closes early, Bex, Louise, Shakil and Keegan take a bus home, but the driver suffers a heart attack and drives through the market and into the viaduct. The students are trapped but escape through the emergency exit. Bex is upset to learn Martin is trapped under the bus, but everyone works together to get him out. Bex stops Louise from truanting after being teased over a video posted online by Keegan of the bus crash and Louise gets Bex to promise that she will not resume her relationship with Shakil. Convinced that Shakil is encouraging Keegan, Louise gets Bex's phone and sends Shakil's naked photo to her friends Alexandra D'Costa (Sydney Craven) and Madison Drake (Seraphina Beh) and Bex is left distressed when she finds out what Louise did and that the photo has been sent to another person. Bex remains angry with Louise, Madison and Alexandra for the way they have treated Shakil and is hurt when Shakil tells her she can "drop dead". On Valentine's Day, Bex receives a card and believes Shakil sent it, however, she realises Louise, Madison and Alexandra played a prank on her. Shakil tells Louise that he has seen Bex and Travis together and Madison and Alexandra tell Louise they believe Bex has been after Travis for a while, but when Louise confronts Bex, she insists they are just friends. Bex takes a liking to Preston Cooper (Martin Anzor), a student from the United States with whom her aunt Michelle (now played by Jenna Russell) had an illegal relationship. Preston encourages Bex to skip school and Preston gets Michelle to Sharon's house, where he is in bed with Bex, and Michelle realises Preston is using Bex to make her jealous. After finding out Bex had sex with Preston, Madison and Alexandra spread the fact, and Keegan and Shakil find out. Keegan suggests to Shakil they should get revenge on Bex, and Keegan imposes Bex's face on a porn video and spreads it around. Bex is humiliated when Martin sees the video. Bex and Martin meet with one of Bex's teachers, where Bex refuses to name anyone involved and they are told it is being passed onto the police as it is treated as an image of child abuse. Martin is called into school and is informed about Shakil's explicit photo. Bex takes the blame for sending it and she and Martin are told Bex will be interviewed under caution by the police the following day because she has distributed an indecent image of a child. Bex overhears Martin talking negatively about her to Stacey. When she tells Louise that she will admit the truth, Louise confesses that Madison and Alexandra were responsible for sending the photo and she should think about bringing them into it. Bex is cautioned and tells Louise, Madison and Alexandra she took the blame despite being the only innocent person, and they laugh at her. The police and social services visit Bex, Martin and Stacey to ask about explicit photos Bex took of herself. Although Bex thought she had deleted the photos and had not sent them on, they had been backed up automatically. Bex is told she can return to school, but when Martin returns her phone, she only receives abuse so decides to do an apprenticeship, which Martin disagrees with her doing. Kush persuades Bex to return to school and not let what is happening ruin her life. Madison and Alexandra overhear Bex insult them when she confronts Louise over their friendship. In the toilets, Madison and Alexandra push Bex, tear her shirt and write on her face whilst Louise stands outside, worried about Bex but feeling unable to help. She admits to teachers Mrs Robyn Lund (Polly Highton) and Mr Gethyn Price (Cerith Flinn) that Louise, Madison and Alexandra were responsible for her attack and sending the photo, but Louise, Madison and Alexandra deny knowledge of either incidents and Bex ends her friendship with Louise, but Linzi offers her support. When Preston returns from Manchester, he and Bex become a couple. Louise finds out that Michelle and Preston are having an affair so tells Bex, who refuses to believe it until she sees Preston touching Michelle and Michelle flinching, so publicly demands to know if Michelle is having sex with her boyfriend. Preston apologises to Bex and admits he loves Michelle. Stacey and Whitney Carter (Shona McGarty) stick up for Bex, ordering Preston to leave. While trying to find Preston, Michelle crashes a car into the chip shop after taking sleeping pills with alcohol. After this, Preston returns to America after being convinced that Michelle does not need him; Bex is glad that he has gone. Michelle tries to make amends with Bex, who reminds Michelle of what she has lost. Bex works alongside Michelle at the café and she snaps at Michelle when Madison and Alexandra make remarks about them and Preston.

Bex goes busking but almost backs out when she sees a group of girls laughing. Shakil persuades her to carry on, but she is stopped by Martin. When Alexandra sees Bex in the local shop, she knocks the sugar she is buying out of her hands and sticks chewing gum in her hair when she goes to pick it up. Later, Bex goes to the café where Kathy asks her to serve Alexandra and Madison their drinks. They insult her and Alexandra trips Bex, causing Kathy to spill soup on Madison. They later warn Bex that she can never escape them, and gain access to Bex's home by telling Stacey they are her friends and they smash her guitar. Bex is then tricked by them into putting mud covered in chocolate in her mouth, which the film and tell her it is cat faeces. Bex sees the video of this online and calls Sonia in tears, who returns to Walford and announces that she wants Bex to live with her. Sonia also visits Bex's school but does not mention Louise is part of the bullying when Bex asks her not to, which gives Louise hope that they can be friends again. After Michelle and Sharon get them talking, Louise agrees not to be friends with Alexandra and Madison, but in front of Bex she tells them she is not friends with Bex again, so Bex walks off in anger. Unknown to Louise, Madison and Alexandra plan to take revenge on her because they blame her for being reported to the school. Bex overhears Madison and Alexandra inviting Travis to a party at Louise's home, which Louise believes will just be for the three girls. Bex tries to warn Louise that they cannot be trusted but Louise accuses her of being jealous because she has no friends of her own. Travis leaves Louise's party and tells Bex that Louise needs her. After Louise gets drunk and is sick, she staggers outside, coughs up blood and collapses, panicking Bex, Madison, Alexandra, Keegan, Travis and Dennis, who are watching. Louise is taken to hospital with paralysis and Sharon tells Louise about Bex finding her. When Louise is sent home, she invites Bex round, but Madison and Alexandra turn up so Bex does not go to Louise's house. After speaking to Dennis about the party on Travis's behalf, Bex tells Louise that Alexandra followed Travis into the kitchen and Alexandra interrupts them. Alexandra gets herself out of trouble by telling Louise and Bex that Travis may not have been responsible for spiking her drink and Louise insists that Madison and Alexandra are still her friends. Bex hears a rumour that Louise had sex with Keegan at the party, so she tells her to take a pregnancy test, but Martin catches Bex purchasing the test for Louise and wrongly assumes it is for herself. Bex is delighted when she learns Stacey and Martin are having a baby.

Sonia returns from Kettering and wants Bex to move in with her and her brother, Robbie Jackson (Dean Gaffney) and Dot, however, Bex wants to remain with Martin and Stacey. Alexandra decides she will take revenge on Bex when she overhears Bex smugly telling Travis that Alexandra will mess up in the showcase. Before Bex's performance at the showcase, Madison and Alexandra break a guitar string and when Bex looks for one in a classroom, Madison and Alexandra pin Bex up against a wall. Shakil hears the bullying through headphones and exposes it through the soundboard. Bex is found locked in the cupboard and she is encouraged to perform following her ordeal. Bex and Louise make amends and Bex decides to go the prom with Shakil. At the prom, Louise suffers burns after being pushed onto lit candles by Alexandra and Madison, leading to their arrests. Bex visits Louise in hospital but her mother, Lisa Fowler (Lucy Benjamin), says Louise wants no visitors and Lisa tells Bex her plans for Louise if she was well. Louise is distressed when Lisa and Bex arrange for Travis to visit her. Bex receives her GCSE results and is disappointed that she gained a D in music, so Sonia contacts Gethin about Bex's result and Gethin agrees to tutor Bex. Following a gas explosion, Bex tends to Gethin's wounds and they kiss. Bex apologises but Gethin reassures her, however, he says he can no longer tutor her and says a relationship would be illegal due to the fact he is her teacher and insists he has no feelings for her. Bex attempts to make Gethin jealous by flirting with Shakil and Gethin asks her to stop her behaviour and he later kisses Sonia, watched by Bex. When Bex claims to have a new boyfriend, Gethin starts tutoring her again. Bex continues to pursue him but he insists nothing can happen, and Louise asks Bex not to chase Gethin. However, Bex tries to get Gethin to admit he likes her, but he goes through with telling Sonia that Bex kissed him. Sonia is furious that the kiss happened weeks ago and throws Gethin out. She asks Bex for the whole truth and Bex insists it was just a kiss and asks Sonia not to report Gethin. Gethin gets drunk and Bex's great-uncle, Jack Branning (Scott Maslen), Gethin's landlord, evicts Gethin when he finds out about the kiss. Gethin then leaves Walford. Louise accidentally tells Shakil about Bex and Gethin, and Bex is heartbroken when Shakil kisses Louise, though Louise is stunned and disgusted by Shakil's immaturity. Bex is devastated when Shakil is stabbed and killed in a knife attack in May 2018.

The following year, overwhelmed by the prospect of going to Oxford, Bex takes drugs to cope with her exams and runs away; she is found by Stuart Highway (Ricky Champ). On the night of her leaving party, Bex writes a suicide note to her parents and attempts to overdose on pills. The following morning, Sonia finds her unresponsive in bed. She recovers well but decides to defer Oxford for a year, and once her life is back on track, she makes the decision to go travelling, which Sonia is unhappy about. However, she writes her mother a letter and successfully persuades her that she's doing the right thing. Martin and Sonia see her off at the Tube station.

Ameena Badawi

Ameena Badawi, played by Shobna Gulati, is Sonia Jackson (Natalie Cassidy)'s social worker. When Sonia gives birth to a daughter after not realising she is pregnant, Sonia is taken to hospital and tells Ameena upon meeting her that she does not want her baby. She names her baby Chloe Jackson and Ameena tries to persuade Sonia to tell her mother, Carol Jackson (Lindsey Coulson), that she has had a baby. Sonia decides she wants Chloe adopted. Sonia hands Chloe over to Ameena, who takes Chloe into foster care. Ameena is later promoted, and Sonia's case is taken over by Diane Irving.

Audrey Trueman

Audrey Trueman, played by Corinne Skinner-Carter, is the mother of Anthony and Paul Trueman (Nicholas Bailey and Gary Beadle) and is later revealed to be the ex-wife of Patrick Trueman (Rudolph Walker).

Audrey was introduced by executive producer John Yorke as the matriarch of a new black family moving to Walford in November 2000. Portrayed as a "busy body", Audrey was axed in September 2001. Actress Corinne Skinner-Carter revealed in 2008 that she believes Audrey was axed because of creative differences she had with the writers about Audrey's backstory: "I received a script and it was all about how Audrey’s first job in England had been as a lavatory cleaner, how she had worked her way up from that to become a B&B owner. I didn’t think it was appropriate and I told them so – she may have come from the bottom but not from the bottom of a toilet!". Although the toilet cleaner reference was dropped, shortly after Skinner-Carter was informed about "a fantastic development in the script – Audrey was going to be killed off." Audrey died of a brain haemorrhage in September 2001.

Audrey moves to Walford in 2000, taking over the bed and breakfast, where she lives with her son Anthony Trueman (Nicholas Bailey). A religious woman, she becomes deeply involved with his life, whilst ignoring her other son, tearaway Paul (Gary Beadle). She disapproves of Anthony dating Kat Slater (Jessie Wallace) and tries to interfere many times, leading to Anthony rebelling against his mother.

Audrey's main reason for ignoring Paul is, that in the past, Paul and Anthony had been in a car crash that had crippled a young girl. Anthony was drunk at the time and was driving but Paul took the blame and went to prison. Audrey is unaware of this and continues to ignore Paul despite his attempts at making her notice him.

In September 2001, Audrey suffers a blow to the head accidentally after being struck by falling debris whilst walking past some building works. Several days later, after an argument with Paul during which he reveals that Anthony was the one who was driving at the time of the accident, Audrey collapses and suffers a severe headache, caused by a delayed reaction to the blow she received earlier.

Just before she dies, Audrey tells Paul that she knew about Anthony being the driver and tells Paul to tell Anthony that she loves him and Paul says "What about me?". Just as Audrey is about to say something to him she dies. However, everything is left to Paul in Audrey's will. Audrey's ex-husband Patrick (Rudolph Walker) arrives in Walford for her funeral. It is subsequently revealed that he and Audrey married in a shotgun wedding, after Audrey became pregnant with Paul. Patrick left shortly after Anthony's birth in the early 1970s. The Truemans later discover that despite Audrey's claims, Paul is not actually Patrick's son; he is the biological child of Milton Hibbert (Jeffery Kissoon), Patrick's friend with whom Audrey had been having an affair.

Anthony Trueman

Anthony Trueman, played by Nicholas Bailey, is the son of Audrey Trueman (Corinne Skinner-Carter), and the brother of Paul Trueman (Gary Beadle). Later, his father is revealed to be Patrick Trueman (Rudolph Walker). Anthony gets engaged to Zoe Slater (Michelle Ryan), however the relationship falls apart when Anthony realises he still loves Zoe's mother, Kat Slater (Jessie Wallace), who he has dated previously.

Trevor Morgan

Trevor Morgan, played by Alex Ferns, is the abusive husband of Little Mo Slater (Kacey Ainsworth). His severe mood swings and physical and emotional violence ruin their marriage. Once during one of his violent outbursts, Little Mo hits Trevor over the head with an iron in self-defence, knocking him unconscious. Trevor reports Little Mo to the police and has her charged with attempted murder. Trevor was killed off in a house explosion on 1 November 2002, ending his reign of terror over Little Mo.

Others

References

External links
 

2000
, EastEnders
EastEnders